The Levasseur PL.200 was an observation seaplane built by Levasseur in the mid-1930s. It was a high-wing monoplane with a short, all-metal fuselage nacelle at mid-span, and a wing made of metal.

Design and development
The fuselage and wings were supported on struts above the two floats which extended rear-wards to form the tail unit with twinfins and rudders and single tailplane with elevator. The  Hispano-Suiza 9Vbrs engine was mounted as a tractor in the nose of the fuselage nacelle, which also housed the crew of three. An improved version was developed, with extended fins and a  Gnome & Rhône 9Kfr engine as the PL.201,

Variants
PL.200 Initial observation seaplane, powered by a  Hispano-Suiza 9Vbrs engine.
PL.201 Improved version with extended fins, powered by a  Gnome & Rhône 9Kfr engine.

Specifications

References

 

PL.200
1930s French military reconnaissance aircraft
Aircraft first flown in 1935